A bubble pipe is a toy shaped like a tobacco pipe, intended to be used for blowing soap bubbles.

Design
Bubble pipes are one of the original bubble toys, Most bubble pipes are made of plastic and therefore cannot be used for actual smoking. They are usually brightly colored, and sometimes feature fanciful designs including multiple bowls (see picture).

Children sometimes use bubble pipes in order to imitate the perceived look of adults.

History

An 18th-century painting by Jean-Baptiste-Siméon Chardin  shows a young boy blowing a bubble out of what seems to be a pipe.

In  1918, John L. Gilchrist filed a patent for a style of bubble pipes that can be produced quickly and easily. Bubble pipes were one of the first and original mass productions of bubble blowers that became popular so that kids could imitate an adult smoker. In the 1940s, the packaging of the bubble pipes were known to be colorful and decorated in a bright style.

References

See also
 Bubble ring
Candy cigarette
Hippy Sippy

Traditional toys
Novelty items